Hong Kong Mathematics Olympiad (HKMO) is a Mathematics Competition held in Hong Kong every year, jointly organized by The Education University of Hong Kong and Education Bureau. At present, more than 250 secondary schools send teams of 4-6 students of or below Form 5 to enter the competition. It is made up of a Heat Event and a Final Event, which both forbid the usage of calculators and calculation assisting equipments (e.g. printed mathematical table). Though it bears the term Mathematics Olympiad, it has no relationship with the International Mathematical Olympiad.

History
The predecessor of HKMO is the Inter-school Mathematics Olympiad initiated by the Mathematics Society of Northcote College of Education in 1974, which had attracted 20 secondary schools to participate. Since 1983, the competition is jointly conducted by the Mathematics Department of Northcote College of Education and the Mathematics Section of the Advisory Inspectorate Division of the Education Department. Also in 1983, the competition is formally renamed as Hong Kong Mathematics Olympiad.

Format and Scoring in the Heat Event
The Heat Event is usually held in four venues, for contestants from schools on Hong Kong Island, and in Kowloon, New Territories East and New Territories West respectively. It comprises an individual event and a group event. Each team sends 4 contestants among 4-6 team members for each event.

For the individual event, 1 mark and 2 marks will be given to each correct answer in Part A and Part B respectively. The maximum score for a team should be 80.

For the group event, 2 marks will be given to each correct answer. The maximum score for a team should be 20.

For the geometric construction event, the maximum score for a team should be 20 (all working, including construction work, must be clearly shown).

In other words, a contesting school may earn 120 marks at most in the Heat Event. The top 50 may enter the Final Event.

Format and Scoring in the Final Event
The Final Event is usually held at the Education University of Hong Kong in Tai Po. It comprises 4 individual events and 4 group events. Before the real events begin, there is a mock event which carries no marks. Each team may send any 4 students for the individual events, and any 4 students for the group events. For every events, only answers are required.

There are 4 questions in each Final Individual Event. The questions have to be solved by alternate contestants independently, and no discussions are allowed. For each event, the questions are interrelated, i.e. to solve the second question, the answer of the first question is needed, and to solve the third, the answer from the second is needed, etc..

There are also 4 questions in each Final Group Event, which may be interrelated or not. The four contestants shall complete each event together, and discussion is allowed.

For each event, 5 minutes is given. There are timekeepers to report the time taken used for each team in each event. The detailed scoring method is:

(A) Score for Accuracy

(B) Multiplying Factor for Speed

(C) Bonus Score
If all answers from a team in an event are correct, 20 marks are given as a bonus.

The score for an event is equal to (A)×(B)+(C). The honour of Champion, 1st Runner-up and 2nd Runner-up are given according to the total score earned in eight events.

Past Champion (1984–2022)
1984: Hong Kong Sze Yap Commercial & Industrial Association Wong Tai Shan Memorial School
1985: Methodist College
1986: Ying Wa College
1987: King's College
1988: Ying Wa College
1989: King's College
1990: Clementi Secondary School
1991: Queen's College
1992: New Territories Heung Yee Kuk Yuen Long District Secondary School
1993: Clementi Secondary School
1994: King's College
1995: Tsuen Wan Public Ho Chuen Yiu Memorial School
1996: Mongkok Workers' Children School (Secondary Section)
1997: Queen's College
1998: Diocesan Boys' School
1999: SKH Bishop Baker Secondary School
2000: La Salle College
2001: Yuen Long Merchants Association Secondary School
2002: King's College
2003: La Salle College
2004: Bishop Hall Jubilee School
2005: La Salle College
2006: Cheung Chuk Shan College
2007: La Salle College
2008: La Salle College
2009: La Salle College
2010: St. Paul's Co-educational College
2011: St. Paul's Co-educational College
2012: La Salle College
2013: La Salle College
2014: La Salle College
2015: La Salle College
2016: La Salle College
2017: Pui Ching Middle School
2018: Pui Ching Middle School
2019: La Salle College
2020: Cancelled
2021: St. Paul's Co-educational College
2022: Diocesan Boys' School

See also
 List of mathematics competitions
 Education in Hong Kong
 Hong Kong Institute of Education
 Hong Kong Mathematical High Achievers Selection Contest
 International Mathematics Olympiad

References
 吳銳堅, 潘建強 &梁興強 (2003). 香港數學競賽必備手冊 (1st ed.). 香港數學競賽簡介, pp. vi-viii. Hong Kong: Hong Kong Educational Publishing Co. .

External links
 Official Website with past papers

Competitions in Hong Kong
Mathematics competitions
Recurring events established in 1983
1983 establishments in Hong Kong